This article is a list of works by Søren Kierkegaard.

A–D
Armed Neutrality, and An Open Letter; with relevant selections from his journals and papers.
 trans. Howard V. Hong and Edna H. Hong with background essay and commentary by Gregor Malantschuk.
 Bloomington, Indiana University Press [1968]

Attack upon Christendom
 trans. Walter Lowrie.
 Princeton, N.J., Princeton University Press [c1968]

The Book on Adler
 eds. and trans. Howard V. Hong and Edna H. Hong.
 Princeton, N.J. : Princeton University Press, c1998.

Christian Discourses and The Lilies of the Field and the Birds of the Air, and Three Discourses at the Communion on Fridays
 trans. by Walter Lowrie, D.D.
 Princeton, NJ : Princeton University Press, 1974.

Christian Discourses; The Crisis and a Crisis in the Life of an Actress
 eds. and trans. Howard V. Hong and Edna H. Hong
 Princeton, N.J. : Princeton University Press, c1997.

The Concept of Anxiety: a simple psychologically orienting deliberation on the dogmatic issue of hereditary sin
 eds. and trans. by Reidar Thomte with Albert B. Anderson
 Princeton, N.J. : Princeton University Press, c1980.

The Concept of Irony, with continual reference to Socrates
 Together with notes of Schelling's Berlin lectures
 eds. and trans. by Howard V. Hong and Edna H. Hong
 Princeton, N.J. Oxford: Princeton University Press, c1989 (1992 [printing])

Concluding Unscientific Postscript to Philosophical Fragments
 eds. and trans. by Howard V. Hong and Edna H. Hong
 Princeton, N.J. Princeton University Press, 1992.

Concluding Unscientific Postscript to Philosophical Fragments
Translated by David F. Swenson, completed after his death by Walter Lowrie
 Princeton, N.J. Princeton University Press, 1941

The Corsair Affair and articles related to the writings
 eds. and trans. by Howard V. Hong and Edna H. Hong
 Princeton, N.J. Princeton University Press, c1981.

Cumulative Index to Kierkegaard's Writings: the works of Søren Kierkegaard
 Cumulative index prepared by Nathaniel J. Hong, Kathryn Hong, Regine Prenzel-Guthrie
 Princeton, N.J. Princeton University Press, c2000.

Diary of a Seducer
 trans. by Alastair Hannay
 London: Pushkin Press, 1999.

E–J
Either/Or (1843)
Eighteen Edifying Discourses (1843-1844)
Edifying Discourses in Diverse Spirits (1845)
Fear and Trembling (1843)
For Self-Examination: Recommended to the Present Age (1851)
Four Upbuilding Discourses, 1843
From the Papers of One Still Living (1838)
The Highpriest - The Publican - The Woman, which was a Sinner
Judge for Yourself! (1851, published posthumously 1876)

K–Q
Kierkegaard's Attack upon "Christendom" 1854-1855.
 Translated, with an introd., by Walter Lowrie.
 Princeton, N.J., Princeton University Press [1968]

Kierkegaard's The Concept of Dread
 Translated with introduction and notes by Walter Lowrie.
 Princeton, Princeton University Press 1957.

Kierkegaard's Concluding Unscientific Postscript
 Translated from the Danish by David F. Swenson, completed after his death and provided with introduction and notes by Walter Lowrie.
 Princeton, Princeton University Press, for American  Scandinavian foundation, 1974, c1941.

The Kierkegaard Reader
 edited by Jane Chamberlain and Jonathan R‚e.
 Malden, MA, Blackwell Publishers, 2001.

Letters and Documents / Kierkegaard
 Translated by Henrik Rosenmeier, with introd. and notes.
 Princeton, N.J. : Princeton University Press, c1978.

A Literary Review : Two ages, a novel by the author of A story of everyday life
 Translated with an introduction and notes by Alastair Hannay. London: Penguin, 2001, reviewed by S. Kierkegaard.
 Published by J.L. Heiberg, Copenhagen, Reitzel, 1845

The Moment and late writings
 Edited and translated with introduction and notes by Howard V. Hong and Edna H. Hong. Princeton, N.J.
 Princeton University Press, c1998.

On Authority and Revelation: The Book on Alder; or, A Cycle of Ethico-Religious Essays
 Translated with an introd. and notes by Walter Lowrie.
 New York, Harper & Row [c1966]

Philosophical Fragments, Johannes Climacus
 Edited and translated with introduction and notes by Howard V. Hong and Edna H. Hong. Princeton, N.J.
 Princeton University Press, c1985.

The Point of View for my Work as an Author; a report to history and related writings
 Translated with introd. and notes by Walter Lowrie. Newly edited with a pref. by Benjamin Nelson.
 New York, Harper [1962]

The Point of View
 Edited and translated with introduction and notes by Howard V. Hong and Edna H. Hong.
 Princeton, N.J. Princeton University Press, c1998.

Practice in Christianity
 Edited and translated with introduction and notes by Howard V. Hong and Edna H. Hong.
 Princeton, N.J. Princeton University Press, c1991.

Prefaces; Writing sampler
 Edited and translated with introduction and notes by Todd W. Nichol.
 Princeton, N.J. Princeton University Press, c1997.

The Present Age and Two Minor Ethico-Religious Treatises
 Translated by Alexander Dru and Walter Lowrie.
 London, New York [etc.] Oxford University Press, 1949.

Purity of Heart is to Will One Thing; spiritual preparation for the office of confession
 Translated from the Danish with an introductory essay by Douglas V. Steere.
 New York Harper & Row [1956, c1948]

R–Z
Repetition: an essay in experimental psychology
 Translated with introduction and notes by Walter Lowrie.
 New York, Harper & Row [1964, c1941]

The Sickness Unto Death: a Christian psychological exposition for upbuilding and awakening
 Edited and translated with introd. and notes by Howard V. Hong and Edna H. Hong.
 Princeton, N.J. : Princeton University Press, c1980.

Stages on Life's Way
 Translated by Walter Lowrie. Introduction by Paul Sponheim.
 New York, Schocken Books [1967]

Stages on Life's Way : studies by various persons
 Edited and translated with introduction and notes by Howard V. Hong and Edna H. Hong.
 Princeton, N.J. Princeton University Press, c1988.

Thoughts on Crucial Situations in Human Life; three discourses on imagined occasions
 Translated from the Danish by David F. Swenson, edited by Lillian Marvin Swenson.
 Minneapolis, Minn., Augsburg publishing house [c1941]

Three Discourses on Imagined Occasions
 Edited and translated with introduction and notes by Howard V. Hong and Edna H. Hong.
 Princeton, N.J. Princeton University Press, 1993.

Three Upbuilding Discourses, 1843 
Edifying Discourses, by Søren Kierkegaard, Vol. I, Translated from the Danish by David F. Swenson and Lillian Marvin Swenson, 
Augsburg Publishing House, Minneapolis, Minnesota, 1943

Eighteen Upbuilding Discourses, Søren Kierkegaard 1843-1844 Copyright 1990 by Howard V. Hong
Princeton University Press

Three Upbuilding Discourses, 1844 
Edifying Discourses, by Søren Kierkegaard, Vol. III, Translated from the Danish by David F. Swenson and Lillian Marvin Swenson, 
Augsburg Publishing House, Minneapolis, Minnesota, 1945

Eighteen Upbuilding Discourses, Søren Kierkegaard 1843-1844 Copyright 1990 by Howard V. Hong
Princeton University Press

Training in Christianity and the Edifying Discourse which accompanied it
 Translated with an introduction and notes by Walter Lowrie.
 Princeton, N.J. Princeton University Press, 1967, 1972 printing.

Two Ages : the age of revolution and the present age, a literary review
 Edited and translated with introd. and notes by Howard V. Hong, and Edna H. Hong.
 Princeton, N.J. Princeton University Press, [1978]

Two Upbuilding Discourses, 1843
Edifying Discourses, by Søren Kierkegaard, Vol. I, Translated from the Danish by David F. Swenson and Lillian Marvin Swenson, 
Augsburg Publishing House, Minneapolis, Minnesota, 1943

Eighteen Upbuilding Discourses, Søren Kierkegaard 1843-1844 Copyright 1990 by Howard V. Hong
Princeton University Press

Two Upbuilding Discourses, 1844 
Edifying Discourses, by Søren Kierkegaard, Vol. III, Translated from the Danish by David F. Swenson and Lillian Marvin Swenson, 
Augsburg Publishing House, Minneapolis, Minnesota, 1945

Eighteen Upbuilding Discourses, Søren Kierkegaard 1843-1844 Copyright 1990 by Howard V. Hong
Princeton University Press

Upbuilding Discourses in Various Spirits
 Edited and translated with introduction and notes by Howard V. Hong and Edna H. Hong.
 Princeton, N.J. Princeton University Press, 1993.

Without Authority ; The Lily in the Field and the Bird of the Air ; Two Ethical-Religious Essays ; Three Discourses at the Communion on Fridays ; An Upbuilding Discourse : Two Discourses at the Communion on Fridays
 Edited and translated, with introduction and notes by Howard V. Hong and Edna H. Hong.
 Princeton, N.J. Princeton University Press, c1997.

Works of Love
 Translated from the Danish by David F. Swenson and Lillian Marvin Swenson. With an introduction by Douglas V. Steere.
 Princeton, N.J., Princeton University Press, 1946.

Works of Love
 Edited and translated with introduction and notes by Howard V. Hong and Edna H. Hong.
 Princeton, N.J. Princeton University Press, 1995.

Original titles
Christian Discourses (Christelige Taler)
The Concept of Anxiety (Begrebet Angest)
The Concept of Irony (Om Begrebet Ironi)
Concluding Unscientific Postscript (Afsluttende uvidenskabelig Efterskrift)
The Crisis and A Crisis in the Life of an Actress (Krisen og en Krise i en Skuespillerindes Liv)
Edifying Discourses in Diverse Spirits (Opbyggelige Taler i forskjellig Aand)
Either/Or (Enten - Eller)
Fear and Trembling (Frygt og Bæven)
For Self-Examination: Recommended to the Present Age (Til Selvprøvelse. Samtiden anbefalet)
Four Upbuilding Discourses (1843) (Fire opbyggelige Taler)
Four Upbuilding Discourses (1844) (Fire opbyggelige Taler)
From the Papers of One Still Living (Af en endnu Levendes Papirer)
The Highpriest - The Publican - The Woman, which was a Sinner (Ypperstepræsten - Tolderen - Synderinden)
Judge for Yourself! (Dømmer selv!)
The Lilies of the Field and the Birds of the Air (Lilien paa Marken og Fuglen under Himlen)
A Literary Announcement (En literair Anmeldelse)
The Moment (Øieblikket)
On my Work as an Author (Om min Forfatter-Virksomhed)
Philosophical Fragments (Philosophiske Smuler)
The Point of View of My Work as an Author (Synspunktet for min Forfatter-Virksomhed)
Practice in Christianity (Indøvelse i Christendom)
Prefaces (Forord)
Repetition (Gjentagelsen)
The Sickness Unto Death (Sygdommen til Døden)
Stages On Life's Way (Stadier paa Livets Vei)
Three Discourses on Imagined Occasions (Tre Taler ved tænkte Leiligheder)
Three Upbuilding Discourses (1843) (Tre opbyggelige Taler)
Three Upbuilding Discourses (1844) (Tre opbyggelige Taler)
Two Minor Ethico-Religious Treatises (Tvende ethisk-religieuse Smaa-Afhandlinger)
Two Upbuilding Discourses (1843) (To opbyggelige Taler)
Two Upbuilding Discourses (1844) (To opbyggelige Taler)
Two Upbuilding Discourses at Friday Eucharist (To Taler ved Altergangen om Fredagen)
An Upbuilding Discourse (1850) (En opbyggelig Tale)
Works of Love (Kjerlighedens Gjerninger)

External links

Full texts
The Journals of Kierkegaard; revised edition, trans. by Alexander Dru
The Journals and Notebooks of Kierkegaard from the Søren Kierkegaard Research Center in Copenhagen 
 Journals and Papers of Kierkegaard in English
Søren Kierkegaards Skrifter. Full Danish texts of many works and journals 
Fear and Trembling. Translated by Walter Lowrie. Published by Princeton University Press, 1941. On-line edition at www.religion-online.org.
Philosophical Fragments. Translated by David F. Swenson and translation revised by Howard V. Hong. Published by Princeton University Press, 1936.
Purity of Heart Is to Will One Thing. Translated from the Danish and contains an introductory essay by Douglas V. Steere. Published by Harper, 1938.
The Sickness Unto Death. Published by Princeton University Press, 1941.

Philosophical (pseudonymous) texts
Fear and Trembling; trans. by Walter Lowrie
Philosophical Fragments; trans. by David F. Swenson
The Sickness Unto Death; trans. by Walter Lowrie

Theological (signed, non-pseudonymous) texts
 Edifying Discourses, by Soren Kierkegaard, translated by David F. Swenson, 1958
Purity of Heart is to Will One Thing; trans. by Douglas V. Steere
For Self-Examination and Judge for Yourselves!; trans. by Walter Lowrie
Religiöse Reden; translated by Theodor Haecker 

Bibliographies by writer
 
Bibliographies of Danish writers
Christian bibliographies
Philosophy bibliographies